The Order of the Black Star (Ordre de l'Étoile Noire) was an order of knighthood established on 1 December 1889 at Porto-Novo by Toffa, future king of Dahomey (today the Republic of Benin).  Approved and recognised by the French government on 30 July 1894, after the establishment of the new statutes of 30 August 1892, according this distinction to all those who worked to develop French influence on the west coast of Africa.

Classes
The order has five classes: Grand-Croix (Grand-Cross), Commandeur avec Plaque (Commander with Plaque), Commandeur (Commander), Officier (Officer), and Chevalier (Knight).

The order was deprecated by decree on 3 December 1963, and superseded by the Ordre National du Mérite. Extant members of the order are permitted to wear their original decorations.

Recipients

 Grand-Crosses
 Amha Selassie
 Hamengkubuwono VIII
 Edgard de Larminat
 Jean de Lattre de Tassigny
 Commanders with Plaque
 Michel Arnaud
 Pedro Correia de Barros
 Gustaf Bonde (1911–1977)
 Smedley Butler
 Jacob Emil van Hoogstraten
 Harry J. Malony
 Jacques Massu
 Ernest Dichmann Peek
 Bengt Rabaeus
 Howard Robertson (architect)
 Sisavang Vong
 Commanders
 Ewart Culpin
 William H. Hay
 John H. Hughes (general)
 Palden Thondup Namgyal
 Pakubuwono X
 Wilhelm Winther
 Arthur Young (police officer)
 Smedley Butler
 John H. Sherburne
 Edward Vollrath
 Officers
 Knights
 Jacques Chirac
 Philip Sassoon
 George A. White
 Unknown Class
 Willy Coppens
 John F. Curry
 Ernest J. Dawley
 Pierre Pouyade
 Michael Scott (golfer)
 Emmet Harris

References

 

1889 establishments in Africa
1889 in the Kingdom of Dahomey
19th-century establishments in the Kingdom of Dahomey
1963 disestablishments in the Republic of Dahomey
Colonial orders of chivalry
Military awards and decorations of France
Orders, decorations, and medals of Benin
Black star
Awards established in 1889
Awards disestablished in 1963